Yellowcard is the tenth and final studio album by American rock band Yellowcard. It was released on September 30, 2016, through Hopeless Records. This was the last album the band released before their breakup in 2017.

Background
On February 24, 2016, Yellowcard announced that they had re-signed with independent label Hopeless Records and had begun work on their next record. The seventh track "Empty Street" was originally recorded as a Big If (ex bassist Sean O'Donell and Key's former side project) demo in 2009. The eighth track "I'm a Wrecking Ball" was a demo originally recorded in 2008 by Key, guitarist Ryan Mendez and Dan McLintock of Inspection 12.

Sessions were held at The Lone Tree Recordings in Franklin, Tennessee; drums were recorded at Sound Emporium in Nashville, Tennessee. Ryan Key and Mendez produced and recorded the album, while Neal Avron mixed it at The Casita in Hollywood, California, with assistance from Scott Skrzynski. Additional engineering was done by Will Pugh and Sean Mackin; Ted Jensen mastered the album at Sterling Sound.

Release
On June 7, 2016, Yellowcard was announced for release in September. In addition, the album's track listing and artwork were revealed. The artwork was taken by guitarist Ryan Mendez. On June 24, the band released the record's first single, "Rest in Peace", along with an announcement that the upcoming record and accompanying world tour will be their last. A music video was also released for "Rest in Peace". On August 17, a music video was released for "The Hurt Is Gone". Yellowcard was released on September 30 through Hopeless Records. The f.y.e. edition of the album includes acoustic versions of "What Appears" and "The Hurt Is Gone" as bonus tracks. The group's final shows took place in late March 2017 in California. On April 12, 2017, a music video was released for "A Place We Set Afire".

Track listing
All music by Yellowcard, except where noted. All lyrics by Ryan Key, except where noted.

Bonus tracks

Personnel
Personnel per booklet.

Yellowcard
 Ryan Key – lead vocals, guitar, piano
 Sean Mackin – violin, backing vocals, mandolin
 Ryan Mendez – guitar
 Josh Portman – bass

Additional musicians
 Nate Young – drums
 Christine Lightner – cello
 Rodney Wirtz – viola

Production and design
 Neal Avron – executive producer, mixing
 Ryan Key – producers
 Ryan Mendez – producer, photos
 Scott Skrzynski – mix assistant
 Ted Jensen – mastering
 Will Pugh – additional engineering
 Sean Mackin – additional engineering
 Joe Brady – band photos
 Brian Manley – artwork, layout

Charts

References

2016 albums
Albums produced by Neal Avron
Hopeless Records albums
Yellowcard albums